George Boba was a painter and engraver of the 16th century, known by the name of Maître Georges. He was a native of Rheims, and is said by Karel van Mander to have been a disciple of Frans Floris, and by others of Titian. His name in full, or included in a monogram very small, is found on some etchings of landscapes with historical subjects, after Primaticcio; Bartsch gives an account of six of them.

References
 

Year of birth unknown
Year of death unknown
Artists from Reims
16th-century engravers
French engravers
French Renaissance painters